Sebastián Javier Rodríguez Iriarte (born 16 August 1992) is a Uruguayan footballer who plays for Peñarol as a central midfielder.

Club career
Born in Canelones, Rodríguez began playing youth football with Danubio, and made his professional debut with the first team on 4 December 2010, starting in a 4–2 home win over Central Español. He finished the season with nine appearances (six starts, 551 minutes of action).

On 27 July 2011 Rodríguez was transferred to Spanish club UD Almería, being initially assigned to the reserves in Segunda División B. Five days later, he was called up for pre-season with the first team squad. He still continued to appear regularly for the B's, however.

On 9 August 2012 Rodríguez reverted to his old name (in his first season abroad he was called Iriarte). He appeared in 12 matches in 2013–14.

On 23 August 2014 Rodríguez joined KF Vllaznia Shkodër, along with compatriot Sebastián Sosa. On 25 September he switched teams and countries again, joining FC Locarno in Switzerland.

International career
Rodríguez played for national team in 2009 U-17 World Cup, with the 8 jersey.

References

External links
 
 Futbolme profile  
 

1992 births
Living people
People from Canelones Department
Uruguayan footballers
Uruguay youth international footballers
Association football midfielders
Uruguayan Primera División players
Segunda División B players
Liga MX players
Ecuadorian Serie A players
Danubio F.C. players
Liverpool F.C. (Montevideo) players
UD Almería B players
FC Locarno players
KF Vllaznia Shkodër players
Club Nacional de Football players
C.D. Veracruz footballers
C.S. Emelec footballers
Uruguayan expatriate footballers
Expatriate footballers in Spain
Expatriate footballers in Albania
Expatriate footballers in Switzerland
Expatriate footballers in Mexico
Expatriate footballers in Ecuador
Uruguayan expatriate sportspeople in Spain
Uruguayan expatriate sportspeople in Switzerland
Uruguayan expatriate sportspeople in Albania
Uruguayan expatriate sportspeople in Mexico
Uruguayan expatriate sportspeople in Ecuador